Karen Marón is an Argentine journalist, war correspondent, producer, international analyst and writer, renowned as one of the top 100 most influential war correspondents in the world in covering armed conflicts, with coverage in more than 30 countries since 2000. As international correspondent specialized in armed conflicts and international politics she has covered conflicts in the Middle East, Latin America, Persian Gulf including the most dangerous places of the world as Iraq, Syria, Lebanon, Colombia, Libya and the Israeli–Palestinian conflict from the Second Intifada up to Israel's military offensive on Gaza Strip.

Since February 2011 she covers the rebellion in Libya and Egypt and the Arab Spring and since 2012 to 2017, she is working in Syria from the heart of the revolt of the Arab country.

She is a member of honor of the World Peace Summit and the Dart Center for Journalism and Trauma - based at the University of Columbia - that recognizes and promotes excellence in reporting violence and trains journalists on issues related to trauma in collaboration with International Society for Traumatic Stress Studies.

Her work stands out for her written and broadcast reports on the humanitarian, economic, social and general situation of the countries with special emphasis on the war victims.

She is a member of the Board of the International Press Club of Madrid, the institution gathers foreign correspondents in Spain.

Marón has been distinguished with more than 20 international awards.

Career 
Marón is an Argentine journalist specialized in the coverage of armed conflicts and international politics. She continues to carry out her work as a freelance correspondent from Iraq, since April 2004 up to 2016, for NBC-Telemundo (United States), BBC World (United Kingdom), Radio France International, El Universal (Mexico), El Tiempo, El Espectador, Caracol Radio (Colombia), Folha de S.Paulo (Brazil), El Mercurio (Chile), Perfil weekly magazine, and Télam of Argentina. Besides, she has contributed to Radio Cooperativa (Chile), Espectador Radio (Uruguay) and Azteca Television (Mexico).

She is recognized widely by her professional labor in Iraq during the military American occupation. From this risky coverage, speaker has spread during the last four years all the news events of the country for the Hispanic world. Her works spread from the coverage of the fourth anniversary of the invasion in 2007, Saddam Hussein's trial and his execution, the first elections to make up the Constitutional Assembly, the Constitutional Referendum and the Parliamentary elections during the military occupation in 2005.

Later, during 2004 to 2011, she gave coverage to the successive changes in power, the first elections to make up the Constitutional Assembly, the Constitutional Referendum and the Parliamentary elections during the military occupation. She met with different Iraqi groups, including Mahdi Army, led by cleric Muqtada Al-Sadr and in secrecy, with Ba'ath Party members. Her work stands out for her written and broadcast reports on the humanitarian, economic, social and general situation of the country during the occupation period, with special emphasis on the war victims.

From April to August 2004, and during the whole of 2005 she has been the only Latin American journalist in Iraq working simultaneously for up to 12 different communications media. Her coverage of the tortures in the Abu Ghraib jails, in May 2004, were published exclusively and for the first time in Latin America by Colombia's El Espectador. She worked in the cities of Baghdad, Najaf, Kerbala, Kufa, Falluja, Kirkuk and Suleimania in Kurdistan.

Before that, she was witness to conflicts and the post-conflict periods in the Middle East, Colombia, Peru and Cyprus for several international media.

In the Arab-Israeli conflict in the Middle East, during 2000 and 2001, she dealt with topics such as the peace process, the Second Intifada and the visit to Bethlehem of Yasser Arafat during Christmas on Jubilee year, interviewing the top Israeli and Palestinian dignitaries. She also covered the confrontations in Ramallah and Beit Jala.

In Colombia, her interview with the Revolutionary Armed Forces of Colombia (FARC), when they declared themselves to be a "State in the making", was considered by specialists as the "interview of the year for 2001" and her work done with women guerrillas won international recognition for its humanitarian content.

There, she also covered the drama of those internally displaced and, in the Putumayo region, worked on the topic of fumigations with Glyphosate that affects thousands of rural and indigenous people. Amongst her outstanding special investigations is the one on the links between the FARC and International Terrorism.

In 2003, she worked in Peru on Sendero Luminoso's/ Shining Path's possible resurgence, interviewing members of that organization. She did special research regarding the Truth Commission and the consequences of political violence.

In March of the same year she gave coverage to the Peace Keeping Operation in Cyprus (UNFICYP) in the light of the possible peace agreement between Greece and Turkey, sponsored by United Nations, to restore peace to the Island in a conflict which has been going on for 37 years. She extended the work to study the bringing about of peace in the Greek-Cypriot and Turkish communities.

She carried out specialized studies in different parts of the world and she has three diplomas for war correspondents. She obtained two grant from the New Journalism Foundation of Colombia, is a member of the Media Corporation Network for Peace of Colombia, the International Journalist Federation, the Latin American Journalist Federation and the International Press Club of Madrid, among others.

She teaches and lectures on, journalists in high risk areas and is author of the Curricular Program of the International Course for correspondents in conflict zones and Peace Operations. She held the position as co-director of the above-mentioned academic activity and gave lectures in Argentina, Spain, Colombia, Cuba and Israel.

In 2003, she was selected as tutor of the First Virtual Seminar New Journalism, prevailed by the Gabriel García Márquez, Literature Nobel Prize and organized by the Monterrey Virtual Technology University and the Latin American New Journalism Foundation which has its seat in Cartagena de Indias, Colombia.

Awards and recognition 

 2017. Distinction as "Illustrious Woman of the Argentine Nation", in recognition of her valuable contribution to the common good and her work for a more dignified, peaceful social life, with sustainable development and respect for the environment. International Academy of Diplomacy and Professions and the Universal Institute of Nations and Civic Parliament of Humanity
 2016. Institute of Strategic Studies and International Relations, Center for Institutional Studies of Defense and Regional Integration, Circle of Legislators of the Argentine Nation and Chamber of Deputies of the Argentine Nation. Distinction as "Notable Woman" at the international level from International Policy, International Humanitarian Law, Refugees, Health and Research.
 2014. Chamber of Deputies of the Argentine Nation. Declaration of Beneplácito by the distinctions obtained by the Argentine journalist Karen Marón as Outstanding Personality of the Culture and the Journalism of the Autonomous City of Buenos Aires, and for being selected as one of the TOP 100 most influential journalists in the world in the coverage of Armed conflict, by the organization Action Against Armed Violence (AOAV), based in London, England. Room of the commission, November 19, 2014.
 2013. AOAV. Action Against Armed Violence Association. London TOP 100: selected as one of the 100 most influential journalists in the world in the coverage of armed conflicts. Among those selected are Christiane Amanpour from CNN, Jon Lee Anderson from New Yorker, Stephen Farrell and Dexter Filkins from The New York Times, Seymour Hersh, Anthony Loyd from The Times, Dan Rather and Lara Logan from CBS, Giuliana Sgrena from Il Manifesto, Robert Fisk of The Independent, Javier Espinosa of El Mundo, Marc Marginedas of El Periódico de Catalunya, among others.
 2012. "Distinguished Personality" in the field of Culture and Journalism, awarded by the Legislature of the Autonomous City of Buenos Aires. Act 4140.
 2010. PortaPaz Award. Seminario Galego de Educación para la Paz. Foundation for a Culture of Peace. Spain. Honor given annually to individuals or entities that stand in the defense of civic and democratic values, human rights and culture of peace. The award was presented by the Galician writer Manuel Rivas journalist and photojournalist Gervasio Sanchez. This prestigious distinction was awarded in previous years to Dr. Federico Mayor Zaragoza,-president of the Foundation for a Culture of Peace and for twelve years who was director general of UNESCO-, Amnesty International, Catalan Institute for Peace Research Center for Peace and Judge Baltasar Garzon.
 2009. Women Entrepreneurs Organization Argentina and Argentine Senate. Award International Day of the Woman 2009 inside the category of Leader Women for "the transcendency of her labor and her contribution to the well-being of the society".
 2008. Foundation Avicena. Recognition of the Merit, for her encomiable professional path, distinction shared with other personalities of the journalistic occupation, of the art and the Argentine culture.
 2007.Argentine Senate. She was honoured on the Journalists' Day for her outstanding international development.
 2007. Rotary International appointed her as Honoris Causa Member as she has fulfilled the principle of "offering herself to those who are in need and Giving of Her before Thinking of Her".
 2007. Legislative House of Buenos Aires City, she was awarded with the Ugarit Distinction for the Youth Revelation of the Year Award at the a prize which was also received by Diego Torres, the worldwide famous Argentine musician.
 2006. International Press Club of Madrid, which groups together foreign correspondents in Spain, awarded her the Recognition Prize for her outstanding work in Iraq.
 2005. Honorable Senate of the Province of Buenos Aires named her Prominent Person in the province for the year in recognition of her international journalistic work in conflict zones.
 2005. Award by the Moreno Business Association (UEM).
 2005. Prize Héctor Germán Oesterheld for her work on armed conflicts and a special distinction.
 2004. Illustrious Citizen of the Moreno District in Buenos Aires, her place of birth.
 2004. Rotary International Prize The Prominent Young Woman of 2004.
 2004. Rotary International Prize Professional Excellence.
 2003. Prize Henry Dunant for the best written press work published in the Southern Cone, for her article "Women Guerrilla", in the Contest on Humanitarian 
Journalism, organized by the International Red Cross Committee.
 2002. Argentinean Joint Peace-Keeping Training Center. CAECOPAZ. Member of Honor.

References

Further reading 
 Algunos artículos. Folha de Sao Paulo. 
 Otros artículos de Karen Marón

External links 
 February 18, 2009: "Siendo corresponsal de guerra, intento la búsqueda de la paz" La impactante historia de Karen Marón. Revista Cosmopolitan. Argentina. Edición 150. CASOS REALES. 
 December 17, 2008: "Periodistas bajo riesgo". Diario Noroeste. El Portal de Sinaloa. México. Conferencia de Karen Marón en el curso de Periodismo en Ambientes Hostiles organizado por la Sociedad Interamericana de Prensa. 
 December 7, 2008: "Hacer periodismo en campo minado" . Diario El Comercio. Lima. Perú.Conferencia de Karen Marón en el Centro Argentino de Entrenamiento Conjunto para Operaciones de Paz de Naciones Unidas. 
 December 6, 2008: "La injusticia femenina de las guerras". Reflexiones de Karen Marón sobre la situación de las mujeres en las guerrasDiario de Navarra. España.. 
 July 21, 2008: "Periodismo y Derechos Humanos se dan la mano". Karen Marón en la firma del Manifiesto de Periodismo y Derechos Humanos del XII Encuentro Internacional de Fotoperiodismo en Gijón Diario El País. Madrid. España. 
 July 18, 2008: "Los fotoperiodistas demandan el compromiso de la prensa con los derechos humanos", por Javier Bauluz, Eduardo Meneses, Karen Marón, Eduardo Márquez, Walter Astrada, Jesús Abad Colorado, Juan Medina y otros. Diario El Mundo. XII Encuentro Intermacional de Fotoperiodismo. Gijón. España.
 June 4, 2008: Cruz Roja Española. Madrid. España. "La protecciòn de la mujeres en los conflictos armados" 
 June 3, 2008: 23 ALNAP Biannual Meeting. Madrid. España. Conferencia "Periodismo y Crisis Humanitaria con Peter Arnett, Karen Marón, Giuliana Sgrena, Alan Nairn y Leslie Crawford" 
 April 15, 2008: Alta Política. Primer Observatorio de las Relaciones Exteriores. Argentina. "Reconocimiento a Karen Marón. Periodista y corresponsal de guerra". 
 March 1, 2008: Se informa. Canadá. "Karen Marón: El proceso de escuchar a las víctimas". 
 October 19, 2007: International Armenian Network. "La corresponsal de guerra Karen Marón distinguida con el premio Distinción Ugarit 2007". 
 August 21, 2007: Periodismo 1837. TEA. Argentina. Conferencia: Coberturas internacionales. 
 June 14, 2007: "Karen Marón: La Voz de las Víctimas" Revista Semana. 
 June 7, 2007: "El Senado homenajea a la periodista Karen Marón" Radio Francia Internacional. 
 February 1, 2007: "El laberinto iraquí" Revista DEF. Argentina. 
 May 30, 2006: "Karen Marón: Historias humanas detrás de los conflictos" Caracol Radio. Colombia Universal. 
 March 21, 2006:"Repórter argentina premiada em Espanha" O sitio do Sindicato dos Jornalistas. Brasil. 
 February 14, 2006:"Premian a periodista argentina por labor en Bagdad" La periodista Karen Marón, corresponsal de EL UNIVERSAL en Irak, obtuvo el Premio Reconocimiento 2005, que concede el Club Internacional de Prensa de España El Universal. México. 
 January 9, 2006:Entrevista a la corresponsal de guerra Karen Marón: "El cáncer en Irak aumentó un 1.200% por el uso de uranio" Faro de Vigo. España. 
 October 25, 2005: "En el Palestine está el recuerdo de Couso" Periodista Digital. España. 
 April 23, 2005: "Karen Marón:O dia-a-dia de uma correspondente de guerra no Iraque" Revista Claudia. Brazil. (in Portuguese)
 March 1, 2005: "Ir al infierno para buscar el paraíso" Revista Bohemia. Cuba. 
 January 30, 2005: "Mesmo sob fogo, é preciso ficar" . Brazil. 
 January 4, 2005: "Karen Marón: Corresponsal de guerra" Mujeres Hoy. Internacional. 
 January 2, 2005: "Direto de Bagdá, receita de pão crocante" Observatório da Imprensa. Brazil. 
 December 19, 2004: "Periodistas en Iraq: el infierno tan temido" International News Safety Institute. Estados Unidos. by Karen Marón 
 May 18, 2004: "Irak: Un desastre humanitario" Página/12. Argentina. Entrevista a Karen Marón.
 March 8, 2004:"Mujeres y conflictos armados: una lucha en todos los frentes" Comité Internacional de la Cruz Roja. Homenaje a Karen Marón en el Día Internacional de la Mujer. 
 January 17, 2004: "Pasiones que desafían el miedo: La otra cara de los conflictos" La Nación Line. Argentina. 
 January 7, 2004: "Karen Marón: Una mujer que va al frente" Mujeres Hoy. Internacional. 
 August 20, 2003: "Una periodista humanizando los conflictos" La Librínsula de los Libros. El Salvador. 

1979 births
Living people
Argentine Maronites
Women war correspondents
Argentine war correspondents
Argentine television journalists
People from Buenos Aires
Women radio journalists
Argentine people of Lebanese descent
Women television journalists